Call Me: The Rise and Fall of Heidi Fleiss is a television film starring Jamie-Lynn Sigler as Hollywood madame Heidi Fleiss. It aired on USA Network on March 29, 2004.

Plot
Heidi Fleiss (Jamie-Lynn Sigler), the daughter of a prominent Los Angeles doctor, becomes a prostitute for well-known Los Angeles Madam Alex (Brenda Fricker). She soon takes over her boss' operation and begins raking in $300,000 a month by hiring only the most beautiful and high-class prostitutes and catering to wealthy Hollywood types, Europeans, Arab sheiks, and American corporate executives. Her operation is broken up by Los Angeles police in 1993 and she is eventually sent to prison for income tax evasion.

Cast
 Jamie-Lynn Sigler as Heidi Fleiss 
 Brenda Fricker as Madame Alex
 Saul Rubinek as Paul Fleiss 
 Emmanuelle Vaugier as Lauren 
 Natassia Malthe as Charisse
 Ian Tracey as Sergeant Willeford 
 Blu Mankuma as Police chief
 Robert Davi as Ivan Nagy 
 Corbin Bernsen as Steve 
 Hrant Alianak as Prince Hassan 
 Crystal Balint as Tracey 
 Susannah Hoffmann as Elissa Fleiss 
 Missy Peregrym as Tina 
 Joe Norman Shaw as Heidi's Lawyer 
 Stefanie von Pfetten as Michelle

Production 
The original title for the movie was Going Down: The Rise and Fall of Heidi Fleiss. Filmed on location in Calgary, Alberta, Canada, many scenes were filmed at Calgary's "Bow River Correctional Centre", a minimum security institution which had been closed and empty for some time before filming and has since been renovated and re-opened as the Southern Alberta Forensic Psychiatric Centre.

Home media 
 
The film was released on Region 1 DVD on May 17, 2005, by 20th Century Fox. It is formatted for closed-caption and subtitled widescreen.

Music 
The film's original score was composed by Ryan Shore.

References

External links
 
 Robert Pardi. Call Me: The Rise And Fall Of Heidi Fleiss
 DAVID MCCUTCHEON. CALL ME: THE RISE AND FALL OF HEIDI FLEISS
 Brian Lowry. Review: ‘Call Me: The Rise and Fall of Heidi Fleiss’
 ALESSANDRA STANLEY. TELEVISION REVIEW; No Inhibitions, or Excuses, for a Hollywood Madam
 Matthew Gilbert. Heidi Fleiss movie 'Call Me' is all gloss, no insight

American biographical drama films
2004 biographical drama films
American films based on actual events
2004 television films
2004 films
USA Network original films
Films about prostitution in the United States
Cultural depictions of prostitutes
Cultural depictions of American women
Films scored by Ryan Shore
American drama television films
2000s American films